This is a list of Bien de Interés Cultural landmarks in the Province of Seville, Spain.

 Ex-Monastery of San Isidoro del Campo
 Chapel of Antiguo Seminario Santa María de Jesús
 Gate of Sevilla (Carmona)
 Walls of Seville
 Church of Santa Catalina (Sevilla)
 Chapel of San José (Sevilla)
 Collegiate Church of Osuna
 Monastery of San Clemente (Sevilla)

References 

 
Seville